Jiří Krkoška and Lukáš Lacko are the defending champions but decided not to participate this year.Gilles Müller and Édouard Roger-Vasselin won the final against Andis Juška and Deniss Pavlovs 6–0, 2–6, [13–11].

Seeds

Draw

Draw

References
 Doubles Draw

Trophee des Alpilles - Doubles
2010 Doubles